Gage Froerer (born September 15, 1952) is an American realtor who served as a Republican member of the Utah House of Representatives for District 8 since from January 1, 2007 to January 2019. Froerer was a candidate for the Utah State Senate in 2004.

Early life and career
Froerer earned a Bachelor of Science degree in finance from Utah State University and a MBA from the University of Utah. He works in real estate and lives in Huntsville, Utah with his wife Gloria and three children.

Political career
2014 
Froerer was unopposed in the Republican primary and won the general election with 3,967 votes (66.08%) against Democrat John Thompson's 2,036 votes (33.9%).

2012 
Froerer was unopposed for the June 26, 2012 Republican primary and won the three-way November 6, 2012 general election with 7,650 votes (64.2%) against Democratic nominee Nick Velis and Libertarian candidate Jared Stratton.

2010 
Froerer was unopposed for the June 22, 2010 Republican primary, and won the November 2, 2010 general election with 4,218 votes (61.8%) against Democratic nominee Alan Wheelwright.

2008 
Froerer was challenged but chosen by the Republican convention for the November 4, 2008 general election, winning with 6,190 votes (57.1%) against Democratic nominee Trent Alvord, who had been Frandsen's opponent in the 2006 Democratic primary.

2006 
When House District 8 incumbent Republican Representative Joe Murray retired and left the seat open, Froerer was unopposed for the 2006 Republican primary and won the three-way November 7, 2006 General election with 3,523 votes (52.7%) against Democratic nominee Matt Frandsen and Constitution candidate John Herbst III, who had been Representative Murray's challenger for the seat in the 2004 Republican primary.

2004
When Senate District 19 incumbent Republican Senator Dave Gladwell left the Legislature and left the seat open, Froerer was one of two candidates selected by the Republican convention for the June 22, 2004 Republican primary from among four candidates in a field which included Representative Melvin R. Brown; Froerer lost the primary to Allen M. Christensen, who went on to win the November 2, 2004 general election against Democratic nominee Jim Hasenyager.

2016 sponsored legislation

Froerer passed eight of the eleven bills he introduced, giving him a 72.7% passage rate. He also floor sponsored eight bills.

References

External links
Official page at the Utah State Legislature
Campaign site

Gage Froerer at Ballotpedia
Gage Froerer at the National Institute on Money in State Politics

Place of birth missing (living people)
1952 births
Living people
Republican Party members of the Utah House of Representatives
People from Huntsville, Utah
University of Utah alumni
Utah State University alumni
21st-century American politicians